Camilla Berg (born 4 September 2000) is a Finnish aesthetic group gymnast. She is a five-time (2016 - 2020) Finnish National champion in Aesthetic group gymnastics competing with Team Minetit. She is the 2017 AGG World champion and the 2016 AGG European champion.

References 

2000 births
Living people
Finnish gymnasts
Gymnasts from Tampere